Iaroslav Semenenko is a Ukrainian paralympic swimmer. He participated at the 2016 Summer Paralympics in the swimming competition, being awarded the bronze medal in the men's 100 metre backstroke S6 event. Semenenko had participated at the 2008 and 2012 Summer Paralympics in the swimming competition without winning a medal. On 13 September 2012, he was awarded the title "Honorary Citizen Of The City Of Slovyansk".

References

External links 
Paralympic Games profile

Living people
Place of birth missing (living people)
Year of birth missing (living people)
Ukrainian male backstroke swimmers
Swimmers at the 2008 Summer Paralympics
Swimmers at the 2012 Summer Paralympics
Swimmers at the 2016 Summer Paralympics
Medalists at the 2016 Summer Paralympics
Paralympic medalists in swimming
Paralympic swimmers of Ukraine
Paralympic bronze medalists for Ukraine
S6-classified Paralympic swimmers
21st-century Ukrainian people